Aleksey Alekseevich Jdanov (born 1 March 1976) is an Uzbekistani football player.

Jdanov was the fourth-leading goal-scorer in the Uzbek League, with 18 goals, during the 1998 season. He later played for FC Lada Togliatti, FC KAMAZ Naberezhnye Chelny and FC Fakel Voronezh in the Russian First Division. After spending 2007 with FC Spartak Tambov, Jdanov returned the Uzbek League with OTMK Olmaliq in 2008.

References

1976 births
Living people
Uzbekistani footballers
Uzbekistani expatriate footballers
FC Lada-Tolyatti players
FC KAMAZ Naberezhnye Chelny players
FC Fakel Voronezh players
FC Spartak Tambov players
Expatriate footballers in Russia
Uzbekistani expatriate sportspeople in Russia
Association football defenders